Vinge is one of Sweden's two largest law firms and one of Europe's 100 largest law firms, with approximately 300 lawyers working in the firm and an annual turnover of about 936 million SEK (about 100 million EURO).  The current firm was created by a merger of several smaller Swedish law firms in 1983.

Vinges offices in Sweden are located in Stockholm, Gothenburg, Malmö and Helsingborg, and the international offices are located in Brussels and Shanghai.

References

External links
Official web site
International Law Office web site

Law firms of Sweden
Law firms established in 1983